KXXX (790 AM) is a radio station broadcasting a farm and classic country radio format. Licensed to Colby, Kansas, United States, the station serves the tri-state region of Northwest Kansas, Northeast Colorado and Southwest Nebraska.  The original station identification was "Ranch and Farm Radio," but soon changed to "Town and Country Radio." It was not affiliated with any national network.  Nationally known personalities on the original staff were John B. Hughes, Johnny Pearson and Jerry Oppy.  The station is currently owned by Rocking M Media, LLC.

In the late 1980s, KXXX was part of the Kansas-based "LS Network" of radio entrepreneur Larry Steckline.

References

External links

XXX
News and talk radio stations in the United States
Radio stations established in 1947
1947 establishments in Kansas